Whitefish Bay High School is a comprehensive public secondary school located in the village of Whitefish Bay, Wisconsin, United States. Enrollment is 947 students, in grades 9 through 12.

The school newspaper, the Tower Times, and the school yearbook, The Tower, both refer to the school building's five-story tower and facade that rise over the main entrance. The school colors are blue and grey. The school's mascot is the "Blue Duke". Whitefish Bay is a member of the North Shore Sports Conference.

Activities
Student extracurricular activities include student government, forensics (individual events), debate, drama, and sports.  A student activity fair is held in September to publicize clubs and activities.

Music

Whitefish Bay High School offers choir, orchestra and band programs to its students in all grades. The orchestra has biennial overseas concerts/trips and the band has an annual stateside trip for seniors.

Athletics
The school sports program offers the following sports:
Boys: football, cross country, soccer, volleyball, skiing, basketball, track and field, tennis, baseball, swimming and diving, golf, and wrestling
Girls: cross country, soccer, volleyball, skiing, basketball, track and field, tennis, softball, swimming and diving, golf, gymnastics, and wrestling

WFBHS won state championships in boys' cross country in 1955, 1957, 1961 and 1962.

Notable alumni 

 Nick Bellore - NFL football player
 Craig Counsell - Major League Baseball player and manager
 Randy Dean - NFL player, handball player at the 1976 Summer Olympics
 Robert Dean - handball player at the 1976 Summer Olympics
 Bernardine Rae Dohrn - co-founder of the Weather Underground
 Matthea Harvey - poet
 Daniel Hirsh - actor and filmmaker
 Jeffrey Hunter - actor
 Kristen Johnston - actress
 Dennis Kois - museum director
 Niels Mueller - screenwriter, director, producer
 Samuel Page - actor
 Mike Schneck - NFL player
 Donald K. Stitt - chair of the Republican Party of Wisconsin
 Meredith Tax - writer and politicial activist
 Chip Zien - actor

References

External links 
 Whitefish Bay High School website
 School District of Whitefish Bay

Public high schools in Wisconsin
Schools in Milwaukee County, Wisconsin